Mame Maty Mbengue (born April 13, 1968 in Dakar) is a Senegalese women's basketball player. She competed at the 2000 Summer Olympics with the Senegal women's national basketball team, where she scored 35 points over 6 games.

References

1968 births
Living people
Basketball players from Dakar
Senegalese women's basketball players
Olympic basketball players of Senegal
Basketball players at the 2000 Summer Olympics